The 2020–21 Stade Malherbe Caen season was the 108th season and current season of the club since its creation in 1913. Caen participated in Ligue 2, the second division of French football, for the second year in a row after relegation from Ligue 1 in 2019, and also competed in the Coupe de France.

Transfers

In

Out

First-team squad
As of 6 October 2020.

Out on loan

Pre-season and friendlies

Competitions

Ligue 2

League table

Results summary

Results by round

Matches
The league fixtures were announced on 9 July 2020.

Coupe de France

References

Caen
Stade Malherbe Caen seasons